Romes (stylized ROMES) is a Canadian alternative rock duo from Toronto, Ontario made up of brothers Jacob and Nicolas Bitove.

History 
Romes was formed in 2016, composed of Canadian brothers Jacob and Nicolas Bitove, along with Irish friends James Tebbitt and Andrew Keyes. The four original members of Romes all met while attending school in Wicklow, Ireland before relocating to Jacob and Nicolas's hometown of Toronto. James and Andrew left the group amicably in 2020, as per an official statement on the Romes Facebook page.

Romes released their debut EP titled Believe on April 8, 2016 and later released their debut, self-titled full-length studio album Romes on October 6, 2017 via Five Seven Music. Both the EP and album were produced and mixed by acclaimed, Grammy-nominated L.A. producer Tony Hoffer (Beck, M83, Phoenix, The Kooks).

The band made their U.S. major festival debut at Austin City Limits Music Festival on October 6, 2017 while on a 34 date U.S. tour supporting Mutemath. The band has also supported artists including The Strokes, Silversun Pickups, and COIN.

In January 2017, Romes were selected by Alternative Press as one of their 'Artists to Watch in 2017'.

The band has since released a collection of singles independently, including Lose My Cool, a collaboration with Foster The People's Mark Foster, and their self-produced EP My Demons Are My Best Friends, released in 2021, featured by Rolling Stone Mexico.

Acclaim 
In September 2017, Romes was selected by Rogers Communications Canada as their "Artist to Watch". The following month, Bell Media, iHeartRadio Canada and Virgin Radio Canada chose the band as their emerging artist. 
On the day of Romes' EP release, Paul Lester selected the band as the Guardian's "New Band of the Week" saying, "The four tracks on their EP virtually knock you down with their brio and self-belief . . .  .Surrounded by swirling synths and ebullient percussion, ROMES sound giddy with possibility."

Romes debuted their first music video for title track Believe on Noisey, part of Vice Magazine; it was stated therein that "'Believe' is an indie-pop anthem replete with layers of unexpected percussion and rippling synths."

Upon the release of Romes' debut EP, the band received praise from superstar artist Hozier who endorsed their EP by saying< "So thrilled Romes have released their debut EP. First releases are rarely this strong.". The band was selected as The Irish Times' 'New Artist of the Week'.

Features 
Romes' 2020 single "Lose My Cool" is used as the theme song for Canadian Broadcasting Corporation's Kim's Convenience spin-off sitcom 'Strays'

Their 2020 single "All The Time" was licensed for Abercrombie & Fitch's Global October 2021 campaign, HBO Max shows Genera+ion and The Sex Lives of College Girls, and feature film Press Play.

"Believe" featured in EA Sports Madden NFL 17 and was licensed by Turner Broadcasting to soundtrack NBA on TNT's NBA Playoffs coverage.

Their song "When The Night Comes" was featured during the MLB All-Star game broadcast on Fox Sports on July 11, 2017.

"Tryna Be" was featured in Georgetown University's national TV campaign.

Discography

Extended plays

Albums

Single releases

Music videos

References 

Canadian rock music groups
Musical groups from Toronto